The 2023 World Weightlifting Championships is an upcoming weightlifting competition scheduled to be held in Riyadh, Saudi Arabia in September 2023.

The event serves as a mandatory event to qualify for the 2024 Summer Olympics in Paris, France. The competition is expected to be held using two platforms instead of one.

References

World Weightlifting Championships
World Championships
Weightlifting Championships
Weightlifting in Saudi Arabia
Weightlifting
World Weightlifting Championships
Weightlifting